Time and Time Again is an album by jazz drummer Paul Motian recorded in 2006 released on the ECM label and featuring performances by Motian with guitarist Bill Frisell and tenor saxophonist Joe Lovano.

Reception
The Allmusic review by Thom Jurek awarded the album 4½ stars, stating: "On Time and Time Again, the band's sense of space, color, and texture reaches outward in a more pronounced manner".

Track listing
All compositions by Paul Motian except as indicated
 "Cambodia" - 4:30 
 "Wednesday" - 3:57 
 "Onetwo" - 4:45 
 "Whirlpool" - 3:12 
 "In Remembrance of Things Past" - 7:58 
 "K.T." - 3:03 
 "This Nearly Was Mine" (Oscar Hammerstein II, Richard Rodgers) - 5:07 
 "Party Line" (Joe Lovano) - 7:43 
 "Light Blue" (Thelonious Monk) - 4:03 
 "Time and Time Again" - 7:27

Personnel
Paul Motian - drums
Bill Frisell - electric guitar
Joe Lovano - tenor saxophone

References 

2007 albums
Paul Motian albums
ECM Records albums